"Love Train" is a 1972 song by the O'Jays.

Love Train may also refer to:
 "Love Train" (Holly Johnson song), 1989
 "Love Train" (Wolfmother song), 2006
 "Love Train", a song by Meek Mill from his 2021 album Expensive Pain
 "Love Train", a song by S Club 7 from their 2000 album 7

See also
 "Love's Train", a 1982 song by Con Funk Shun
 Love Train – The Philly Album, an album by Sonia
 The Love Train, an EP by Meghan Trainor